Gambhir Singh Mura (1930 – 9 November 2002) was an Indian tribal dancer known for his contributions to the tribal martial dance of Chhau. He was an exponent of the Purulia school of Chhau.

Mura was born in a tribal family to Jipa Singh Mura at Pitikiri Bamni village in Purulia district in the Indian state of West Bengal. He performed in many places such as England, France, Japan and USA. The Government of India awarded him the fourth highest Indian civilian honour of Padma Shri in 1981.

See also

 Chhau dance

References

1930 births
2002 deaths
Recipients of the Padma Shri in arts
People from Purulia district
Dancers from West Bengal
Indian male dancers
Tribal art
Bhumij people
Recipients of the Sangeet Natak Akademi Award
Chhau exponents